Andrus Utsar (born 20 March 1976) is an Estonian weightlifter.

He was born in Tallinn.

Andrus has competed in numerous European Championships. He failed a doping test in 2006 and got two year suspension for the use of Stanozolol.

His father is Karl Utsar, another Estonian weightlifter.

References 

Living people
1976 births
Estonian male weightlifters
Sportspeople from Tallinn